This is an episode guide for the television series The Saint, which originally aired in the United Kingdom between 1962 and 1969. The series was developed by Robert S. Baker based upon the literary character created by Leslie Charteris. The majority of the episodes listed below – including all of the black-and-white episodes – were adaptations of short stories, novellas and novels in the Charteris canon.

Production blocks: (1) series one 26 episodes, (2) series two 13 episodes. (3) The next 32 episodes were made as series two and the 39 previous episodes were re-branded as series one for worldwide distribution. (4) 30 episodes plus the feature film version of "The Fiction Makers". (5) 13 episodes plus the feature film version of 'Vendetta for the Saint'. "The Fiction Makers" was shot by director Roy Ward Baker in a dual format, principally as a feature for European Cinema distribution, and as a television two-parter scripted to include a scene to begin part two with the usual The Saint halo sequence (the film and TV versions are edited differently also). The film version was given a U certificate by the British Board of Film Censors (BBFC) on 29 September 1966. "Vendetta for the Saint" was made without provision for a TV edit and has no special halo sequence for part two; also part two has the film version's 'end' caption. The 71 b/w episodes were originally divided into four series in the UK and the colour episodes were series 5 and 6. The colour episodes were originally broadcast in the UK in black and white, predating the advent of colour TV transmissions on ITV.

Black-and-white episodes were produced by Robert S. Baker and Monty Berman and are A New World Production for ITC. (The first 20 episodes are copyright: ITC Incorporated Television Company Ltd and Granada Television Network Ltd.)

Colour episodes were produced by Robert S. Baker and are A Bamore Production for ITC.

Series overview

Episodes

Series 1: 1962

Series 2: 1963–64

Series 3: 1964–65

Series 4: 1965

Series 5: 1966–67
Beginning with this series, episodes were produced in colour.

Series 6: 1968–69

External links
 
 The Saint on TV episode listing

The Saint (Simon Templar)
Saint, The